Domeykos is an extinct genus of ray-finned fish that lived in what is now Chile during the Oxfordian stage of the Late Jurassic epoch. It contains one species, Domeykos profetaensis.

References

External links

Crossognathiformes
Prehistoric ray-finned fish genera
Oxfordian genera
Late Jurassic fish
Jurassic fish of South America
Jurassic Chile
Fossils of Chile
Fossil taxa described in 1985